Pogonocherus eugeniae is a species of beetle in the family Cerambycidae. It was described by Ganglbauer in 1891. It is known from Croatia, Bosnia and Herzegovina, Austria, Greece, Romania, and Italy.

References

Pogonocherini
Beetles described in 1891